"Woman Don't You Cry For Me" is a song by English musician George Harrison, released as the opening track of his 1976 album Thirty Three & 1/3.

Background
Harrison started writing the song in Gothenburg, Sweden, in 1969. Along with his friend, fellow guitarist Eric Clapton, Harrison was on a European tour at the time with Delaney & Bonnie and Friends. Delaney Bramlett handed Harrison a bottleneck slide guitar, which he immediately began to play around with. One of the first results of Harrison's discovery of this instrument was "Woman Don't You Cry For Me". He later said that the title of the song might have been suggested by Bramlett. The song almost went on his 1970 triple album All Things Must Pass, but instead appeared on Thirty Three & 1/3, released in 1976. In May 1977, it also appeared as the B-side to the third single off the album in the UK, "It's What You Value".

"Woman Don't You Cry for Me" is one of several bottleneck-inspired Harrison tunes from the period − "Sue Me, Sue You Blues", "I Dig Love", "Māya Love" and "Hari's on Tour (Express)" being others. The song is in open E.

Re-release
In November 2011, an early take of "Woman Don't You Cry for Me" was included on the deluxe edition CD for the British DVD release of the Martin Scorsese-directed documentary George Harrison: Living in the Material World. This version is included on Early Takes: Volume 1.

Personnel
 George Harrison – vocals, slide guitars, tambourine, jew's harp
 David Foster – clavinet
 Richard Tee – organ
 Willie Weeks – bass
 Alvin Taylor – drums
 Tom Scott – baritone saxophones

References

1976 songs
George Harrison songs
Songs written by George Harrison
Song recordings produced by George Harrison
Music published by Oops Publishing and Ganga Publishing, B.V.
Dark Horse Records singles